Srdjan Vujmilovic (born 15 May 1994, in Banja Luka) is an artist and photographer who lives in Aleksandrovac, Republic of Srpska, Bosnia and Herzegovina. His subjects include nature, architecture, portrait, astrophotography and landscape. His media includes light painting, time-lapse photography, videography and graphic design. He has been taking photographs since 2012.

Exhibitions

Srdjan has had three solo exhibitions, including the second solo exhibition entitled Unique Vision with the theme of tolerance and the unity of man with nature, where he presented 64 photographs.

Awards and mentions 

He is the winner of the photography contest Rovinj PhotoDays 2017, where he won first place in the 'Landscape' category. His work has been published by Canon, medias such as Buka, eTrafika, www.banjaluka.com, www.banjalucanke.com, Mojabanjaluka.info, BB Portal, Banjaluka.net, Moja Banjaluka, Srpska Cafe, Karike, as well as Blic, Dani, and Nezavisne Novine national newspapers.

He was featured in television programs such as Morning Program on BN television, Morning Program RTRS television,  and Serbian television show, Zikina Sarenica.

His works have also been published in magazines like Practical Photography Magazine and Photography Masterclass Magazine, as well as on portals such as Discovery Channel and National Geographic.

References

External links 

Srdjan Vujmilovic Photography Website
 
 

1994 births
Living people
Landscape photographers
People from Banja Luka
Bosnia and Herzegovina photographers
Male artists
21st-century photographers
Portrait photographers
Commercial photographers
Fine art photographers
Nature photographers